Colorado Mesa University is a public university in Grand Junction, Colorado. The university's other locations include Bishop Campus, which houses Western Colorado Community College in northwestern Grand Junction, and a regional campus in Montrose, Colorado. Colorado Mesa University grants associate degrees, bachelor's degrees, and master's degrees.

Previously Mesa State College, the college attained university status in August 2011 and changed its name to Colorado Mesa University.

Board of Trustees
The Board of Trustees has 13 trustees (11 voting and two non-voting). The voting members are appointed by Colorado's governor and confirmed by the Colorado State Senate and serve staggered terms. The Colorado Mesa University Student Trustee is elected by the student-body and is considered one of the most influential positions in the university and college system. The Senatus Academicus names a member from its ranks to serve as the eleventh member. The Board meets regularly throughout the year and is charged with hiring the president, guiding the mission, and overseeing the budget.

Academics
Colorado Mesa University offers programs leading to awards in five levels: technical certificates, associate degrees, baccalaureate degrees, master's degrees and professional doctoral degrees.

Colorado Mesa University is accredited by The Higher Learning Commission and is a member of the North Central Association.

As of 2023, half the student body were first-generation college students.

Financial aid
During the 2010–11 school year, Colorado Mesa University distributed over $48 million in financial aid to 75% of the student body through scholarships, grants, loans and student employment. The Mesa State Foundation also awarded more than $300,000 in private scholarships to over 300 students.

Residence life

Colorado Mesa University offers options for students to live on campus. Over 2,000 students live on campus in 11 residential buildings, consisting of traditional rooms, suites and pods, and apartments.

Residence halls and apartments are governed by the Residence Hall Association (RHA). The Residence Hall Council (RHC) is an extension of RHA and acts as the governing body for each residence hall. The RHC of each building is composed of an elected executive board and an RHA representative.

Notable facilities

Houston Hall
Houston Hall has the reputation of being the first building on campus. Built in 1940, it is named for the college's first president, Dr. Clifford G. Houston. Before its construction, the college had occupied an abandoned school building (the old Lowell School) in the city's downtown area. During the 2011 expansion and renovation project, delicate care was taken to match the new wing's ornamental brick facade with that of the original building.

Dominguez Hall
Dominguez Hall was built in 2011 and is home to the Davis School of Business and the Center for Teacher Education. This building has several classrooms, including four large semi-circle lecture rooms, computer labs, small study rooms, study open spaces (indoors and outdoors), faculty offices, a coffee shop, and a boardroom.

Lowell Heiny Hall
Originally built in 1967 to house the college library, previously located in Houston Hall, Lowell Heiny Hall now houses University Authorities offices, Registrar's Office, President's Office, HR, Marketing, and faculty offices.

The University Center
The University Center was built in 2010 to replace the aging W.W. Campbell College Center. It houses the main campus dining facilities, including Dining Hall, Bookcliff Cafe, Starbucks Coffee, and a small convenience store. The center also houses the Associated Student Government, The Criterion campus newspaper, KMSA 91.3FM, Bookstore, Ballroom, student lounges, MAV Card Office, and the Student Life office, which contains some club offices.

The Maverick Center
Formerly known as Saunders Field House, The Maverick Center houses all athletic facilities in one building, except for football and baseball. Facilities include Brownson Arena, El Pomar Natatorium, Hamilton Recreation Center, and Monfort Family Human Performance Lab. Adjacent to The Maverick Center are Walker Field soccer and lacrosse stadium, Elliot Tennis Complex, Bergman Softball Field, and the Maverick Pavilion.

Moss Performing Arts Center
The Moss Performing Arts Center, named for local Colorado Mesa University supporters John and Angie Moss, provides music, dance and theatre students with the facilities needed to let their creativity shine. The center, which recently underwent a $5.1 million renovation and expansion, is home to the 600-seat William S. Robinson Theatre, a 300-seat recital hall, the Walter Walker Reception Area, the Mesa Experimental Theatre, a design studio, numerous music practice rooms, smart technology classrooms, faculty offices and a dance studio.

Moss is the home to the Theatre and Music Departments which offer a variety of entertainment for the campus and local community throughout the year.

Tomlinson Library
By 1984 the library's collection had outgrown Lowell Heiny Library and plans were made to build the collection a new home. The new library was dedicated in 1986. Recognized as an architectural gem in American School and University magazine, the library was named for outgoing college president John U. Tomlinson in 1988 to honor his commitment to improved library services at the college. Tomlinson Library contains over 190,000 volumes, including a large government documents collection, and a geology library. It also houses the Ethridge Pottery Collection of prehistoric southwestern ceramics.

Forensic Investigation Research Station 

Known by the acronym "FIRS", this facility consisting of a laboratory building and a fenced-in body farm is located just outside Grand Junction. As of January 2018, the decomposition of 11 bodies was under investigation with a focus on identification of microbial clocks, collections of microorganisms that appear and change in a predictable manner during the course of human body decomposition.

Athletics

CMU's athletic teams are known as the Mavericks; their mascot is symbolized by a rearing bull's head with flaring nostrils. Official colors are maroon, white, and gold. Student body fans are known as The Herd.

The Colorado Mesa Mavericks have 28 varsity teams that compete in NCAA Division II athletics, as part of the Rocky Mountain Athletic Conference. CMU fields teams in men's football, men's baseball, men's and women's basketball, women's volleyball, men's and women's cross country, men's and women's indoor and outdoor track and field, men's and women's golf, men's and women's soccer, men's and women's lacrosse, women's softball, men's and women's swimming, men's and women's tennis, and men's and women's wrestling.

Student media
KMSA 91.3 FM 
The Criterion, student newspaper
CMU-TV, student-run television station
Horizon, student-run magazine

References

External links

Colorado Mesa University Athletics website

 
Public universities and colleges in Colorado
Schools in Mesa County, Colorado
Grand Junction, Colorado
Montrose, Colorado
Education in Mesa County, Colorado
Education in Montrose County, Colorado
Educational institutions established in 1925
Colorado Western Slope
1925 establishments in Colorado
Tourist attractions in Mesa County, Colorado